Bajuni (Kibajuni), also known as Tikulu (Tikuu), is a variety of Swahili spoken by the Bajuni people who inhabit the tiny Bajuni Islands and coastal Kenya, in addition to parts of southern Somalia, where they constitute a minority ethnic group. Maho (2009) considers it a distinct dialect. Nurse & Hinnebusch (1993) classify it as a Northern Dialect of Swahili.

Consonant Inventory 
The consonant inventory is as follows according to Nurse & Hinnebusch (1993:570).

Note: [ⁿdr] represents a sound pronounced with an r-like offglide (Nurse & Hinnebusch 1993: 151).

See also
Bajuni people

Notes

References

http://www.ucs.mun.ca/~dnurse/

Languages of Kenya
Languages of Somalia
Swahili language